Paralysis is the complete loss of muscle function for one or more muscle groups.

Paralysis may also refer to:

 Paralysis (album), a 2001 death metal album
 Paralysis (band), a gothic metal band
 Paralysis (EP), a 2001 progressive rock album
 Paralysis (novel), a Gujarati novel by Indian writer Chandrakant Bakshi

See also
 Paralysed (disambiguation)
 Paralyzer (disambiguation)